Date juice or Khejur Ras is sweet sap extracted from the Date Palm trees of Bengal in winter. It contains high natural sugars and others natural form.

Bangladesh produces around 20,000 tonnes of date molasses in each year. And Kalkini Upazila region in Bangladesh, is mostly famous for its Date Juice and Date Molasses/Gur.

References

Bengali cuisine
Tree tapping
Date dishes